Attorney General Condon may refer to:

Charlie Condon (born  1953), Attorney General of South Carolina
Colm Condon (1921–2008), Attorney General of Ireland